The Yellowknife City Council is the governing body of the city of Yellowknife, Northwest Territories, Canada. The council consists of a mayor and eight councillors originally elected to three year terms, but after a referendum in 2018 this has now been changed to four year terms. 

The current mayor of Yellowknife is Rebecca Alty. 

The next Yellowknife Municipal Election will take place on October 17, 2022.

2022-2026 council 
Rebecca Alty, mayor 
Rob Warburton
Cat McGurk
Stacie Arden Smith
Tom McLennan
Garrett Cochrane
Ryan Fequet
Steve Payne
Ben Hendriksen

2018-2022 council 
In the 2018 election, voters chose to extend the term of office from three to four years. 

Rebecca Alty, mayor
Shauna Morgan
Julian Morse
Robin Williams
Steve Payne
Stacie Smith
Niels Konge
Cynthia Mufandaedza
Rommel Silverio

Election results (mayor)

2022

2018

2015

2012

2009

2006

2003

2000

Election Results (Councillors)

2022 
2022 had 3,939 voters out of an eligible 8,190, which represents a 48% voter turnout. This is down from the 56% turn out in 2018.

2018 
2018 saw 5,354 voters out of an eligible 9,544, which represents a 56% voter turnout.

Referendum in 2018 election to increase term of office for City Council from three to four years

References

External links 
 Yellowknife City Council website
Yellowknife. City Council fonds. Northwest Territories Archives

Municipal councils in Canada
Politics of the Northwest Territories
Yellowknife
Government of the Northwest Territories